The Namibia national under-17 football team is the national under-17 football team of Namibia and is controlled by the Namibia Football Association. 

The team competes in the Africa U-17 Cup of Nations and the FIFA U-17 World Cup, which are both held every two years. The under-17 team also participates in local, regional and international friendly tournaments, like the COSAFA U-17 Challenge Cup. They recently lost to the Republic of the Congo 5-1 in two legs to bow out of the 2017 Africa U-17 Cup of Nations qualification stage.

Current squad 
 The following players were called up for the 2023 Africa U-17 Cup of Nations qualification matches.
 Match dates: 4 and 6 December 2022

 Tournament Records 
 FIFA U-16 and U-17 World Cup record 

 Africa U-17 Cup of Nations record *Draws include knockout matches decided on penalty kicks.''

See also

 2007 African U-17 Championship qualification
 2009 African U-17 Championship qualification
 2011 African U-17 Championship qualification
 2013 African U-17 Championship qualification
 2015 African U-17 Championship qualification
 2017 Africa U-17 Cup of Nations qualification
 Namibia national football team
 Namibia national under-20 football team

References

External links

 
 Namibia at FIFA.com.
 Namibia at CAF Online.
 African U-17 Championship 1999 at RSSSF.com.
 African U-17 Championship 2001 at RSSSF.com.
 African U-17 Championship 2003 at RSSSF.com.
 African U-17 Championship 2005 at RSSSF.com.
 African U-17 Championship 2007 at RSSSF.com.
 African U-17 Championship 2009 at RSSSF.com.
 African U-17 Championship 2011 at RSSSF.com.
 African U-17 Championship 2013 at RSSSF.com.
 African U-17 Championship 2015 at RSSSF.com.
 African U-17 Championship 2017 at RSSSF.com.

African national under-17 association football teams
Under-17